Behind the ostium of the eustachian tube (ostium pharyngeum tuba auditiva) is a deep recess, the pharyngeal recess (fossa of Rosenmüller).

Clinical significance
At the base of this recess is the retropharyngeal lymph node (the Node of Rouvier). This is clinically significant in that it may be involved in certain head and neck cancers, notably nasopharyngeal cancer.

References

External links
 
 

Human head and neck